Hope St Platform was a railway-employee only station on the Flemington-Campsie Goods Line in Sydney, Australia that opened on 15 August 1927. Railway workers including shunters, drivers, fitters, etc. from the various railway workshops between Delec and Enfield South used Hope Street station to get to and from work. Hope Street is named because of its locality to a side street off Cosgrove Road near the station. The station and Up Main were closed when the rebuilt Enfield Yard opened in 1996.

Neighbouring stations 
The former Enfield Loco Platform is located up whereas Delec Platform is down from the site.

References

Disused railway stations in Sydney
Railway stations in Australia opened in 1927
Railway stations closed in 1996
1996 disestablishments in Australia